The 1970 Preakness Stakes was the 95th running of the $205,000 Preakness Stakes thoroughbred horse race. The race took place on May 16, 1970, and was televised in the United States on the CBS television network. Personality, who was jockeyed by Eddie Belmonte, won the race by a scant neck over runner-up My Dad George. Approximate post time was 5:42 p.m. Eastern Time. The race was run on a fast track in a final time of 1:56-1/5.  The Maryland Jockey Club reported total attendance of 42,474, this is recorded as third highest on the list of American thoroughbred racing top attended events for North America in 1970.

Payout 

The 95th Preakness Stakes Payout Schedule

The full chart 

 Winning Breeder: Bieber-Jacobs Stables; (KY)
 Winning Time: 1:56 1/5
 Track Condition: Fast
 Total Attendance: 42,474

References

External links 
 

1970
1970 in horse racing
1970 in American sports
1970 in sports in Maryland
Horse races in Maryland